Kirkwood is a historic plantation house in Eutaw, Alabama. The house was recorded by the Historic American Buildings Survey in 1934 and by Carol M. Highsmith in 2010.  It was placed on the National Register of Historic Places on May 17, 1976, due to its architectural significance.

Architecture
Kirkwood is built in the Greek Revival style with Italianate influences. Foster M. Kirksey began building the house in 1858. Construction was halted by the American Civil War, leaving several features of the house incomplete.  The house is wood framed with two primary floors and a large cupola crowning the low-pitched hipped roof.  The roof eaves are ornamented with wooden brackets.  A Carolina-type monumental portico with Ionic columns wraps around two sides of the house. The balcony railings, cupola, and several minor features were completed in the 1970s, when Roy and Mary Swayze restored the house.  The Swayze family was awarded a National Trust for Historic Preservation Honor Award in 1982 for their restoration efforts.

References

External links

National Register of Historic Places in Greene County, Alabama
Houses on the National Register of Historic Places in Alabama
Greek Revival houses in Alabama
Italianate architecture in Alabama
Plantation houses in Alabama
Houses in Greene County, Alabama
Historic American Buildings Survey in Alabama